Eskandeh (also Romanized as Eskendeh; also known as Eshene and Iskandeh) is a village in Harazpey-ye Shomali Rural District, Sorkhrud District, Mahmudabad County, Mazandaran Province, Iran. At the 2006 census, its population was 515, in 136 families.

References 

Populated places in Mahmudabad County